Rialto Municipal Airport , originally Miro Field, was a general aviation airport three miles (5 km) northwest of Rialto, in San Bernardino County, California, United States.

It was used by private aircraft; no airlines flew into this airport. It was about 12 miles northeast of Ontario International Airport and ten miles west of San Bernardino International Airport. The airport did not have a control tower and averaged 82 operations a day.

An FBO with a flight school and a separate helicopter flight school operated at the airport.  There were several aviation related businesses. Warbirds West Air Museum is relocating its warbird collection to the big hangar at the center of the field.  The airport cafe is attached to the WWAM hangar. There was an air ambulance business in the southeast part of the airport.

Despite its size compared to nearby airfields (Upland Cable Airport, Corona Municipal Airport, El Monte Municipal Airport, Redlands Municipal Airport and Hemet-Ryan Airport), Rialto was a relatively quiet airport.  This led the city of Rialto to approve the closing of the airport by 2009/2010 for redevelopment, driven by real estate developers. The airport was expected to close by January or February 2015, once the San Bernardino County Sheriff's Department Aviation Division relocated to the San Bernardino International Airport. Development of Renaissance Marketplace was planned to begin as soon as the airport closes and the runways are removed. On September 18, 2014, the airport officially closed to air traffic; all runways are marked with yellow Xs.

History

In 1978 Art Scholl Aviation, founded by Art Scholl, relocated to Rialto Airport from nearby Flabob Airport in Riverside.

Since 1984 the City of Rialto accepted more than US$15 million in federal aid for airport improvement and land purchases.

On September 18, 2014, the airport was officially closed.

Facilities 

References

External links 

Airport Master Record (FAA Form 5010), also available as a printable form (PDF)
Rialto Airport at Abandoned & Little-Known Airfields

Defunct airports in California
Airports in San Bernardino County, California
Rialto, California